Sanyang railway station is a railway station in Shexian County, Huangshan, Anhui, China. It opened on 25 December 2018 along with the Hangzhou–Huangshan intercity railway.

References 

Railway stations in Anhui
Railway stations in China opened in 2018